The 2011 Western Athletic Conference football season is a college football season for the Western Athletic Conference. The 2011 season consisted of eight members: Fresno State, Hawaii, Idaho, Louisiana Tech, Nevada, New Mexico State, San Jose State, and Utah State.

This season the WAC's membership changed for the first time since 2005. Boise State, who joined the conference in 2001, left to join the Mountain West Conference.

This season was the last year of membership for three other schools: Fresno State, Hawaii, and Nevada. All became members of the Mountain West in 2012 (Hawaii as a football only member, other sports will join the Big West Conference). In response to their departure, the WAC added five new members in 2012. Of the new members, only Texas State and UTSA had football programs.

Previous season

After going 14–0 in 2009, Boise State started the season in the top 5 in both the AP and Coaches preseason polls and was picked to win the conference. Boise State spent a majority of the season ranked in the top 4, including climbing as high as #2 in the AP and Harris polls, while running their nation leading win streak to 24 games before their day after thanksgiving matchup with #19 Nevada. Nevada, whose only loss of the season was at Hawaii, defeated the #3 ranked Broncos in overtime. Boise State, Nevada, and Hawaii all finished the season 7–1 to share the WAC title.

In bowl games, Boise State (12–1) defeated Utah 26–3 in the Maaco Bowl Las Vegas. Hawaii (10–4) lost to Tulsa 35–62 in the Hawaii Bowl. Nevada (13–1) defeated Boston College 20–13 in the Kraft Fight Hunger Bowl. Fresno State (8–5) lost to Northern Illinois 17–40 in the Humanitarian Bowl.

Preseason

Award watch lists
The following WAC players were named to preseason award watch lists.

Maxwell Award:
 Bryant Moniz – Hawaii

Fred Biletnikoff Award:
 Royce Pollard – Hawaii
 Rishard Mathews – Nevada
 Noel Grigsby – San Jose State

Bronko Nagurski Trophy:
 Logan Harrell – Fresno State
 James-Michael Johnson – Nevada
 Bobby Wagner – Utah State

Outland Trophy:
 Logan Harrell – Fresno State
 Chris Barker – Nevada

Jim Thorpe Award:
 Duke Ihenacho – San Jose State

Lombardi Award:
 Corey Paredes – Hawaii
 Bobby Wagner – Utah State

Rimington Trophy:
 Tyler Larsen – Utah State

Davey O'Brien Award:
 Bryant Moniz – Hawaii

Doak Walker Award:
 Lennon Creer – Louisiana Tech
 Robert Turbin – Utah State

Walter Camp Award:
 Bryant Moniz – Hawaii

Lou Groza Award:
 Trey Farquhar – Idaho
 Kevin Goessling – Fresno State

WAC Football Preview
During the WAC Football Preview in Las Vegas on July 27–28, Hawaii was selected as the favorite to win the conference by both the media and the coaches. In the media poll, Hawai received 18 first place votes. Fresno State and Nevada both received 11 first place votes with Utah State receiving one. In the coaches poll, Hawaii received five first place votes while Fresno State, who ranked second, received one first place vote and Nevada, who ranked third, received two first place votes.

Media Poll
 Hawaii – 292 (18)
 Fresno State – 284 (11)
 Nevada – 264 (11)
 Louisiana Tech – 184
 Utah State – 164 (1)
 Idaho – 141
 San Jose State – 85
 New Mexico State – 60

Coaches Poll
 Hawaii – 47 (5)
 Fresno State – 41 (1)
 Nevada – 40 (2)
 Louisiana Tech – 31
 Utah State – 22
 Idaho – 21
 San Jose State – 15
 New Mexico State – 7

The media also voted on the WAC preseason players of the year. Hawaii's Bryant Moniz was selected as the offensive player of the year and Utah State's Bobby Wagner was selected as the defensive player of the year.

Coaches
NOTE: Stats shown are before the beginning of the season

WAC vs. BCS matchups

Regular season

All dates, times, and TV are tentative and subject to change.

The WAC has teams in four different time zones. Times reflect start time in respective time zone of each team (Central–Louisiana Tech, Mountain–New Mexico State, Utah State, Pacific–Fresno State, Idaho, Nevada, San Jose State, Hawaiian–Hawaii). Conference games start times are that of the home team.

Rankings reflect that of the USA Today Coaches poll for that week until week eight when the BCS poll will be used.

Week one

^ Neutral site

Players of the week:

Week two

Players of the week:

Week three

Players of the week:

Week four

Players of the week:

Week five

Players of the week:

Week six

Players of the week:

Week seven

Players of the week:

Week eight

Players of the week:

Week nine

Players of the week:

Week ten

Players of the week:

Week eleven

Players of the week:

Week twelve

Week thirteen

Week fourteen

All-WAC Teams

Bowl games

Home attendance

References